Raimondi may refer to:

 Raimondi (surname), an Italian surname
 Raimondi Chapel, a chapel within the church of San Pietro in Montorio, Rome
 Raimondi District, a district in the middle Atalaya Province in Peru
 Raimondi Park, park in Oakland, California, United States of America
 Raimondi Stele, a sacred object and significant piece of art of the Chavín culture
 Raimondi's yellow finch, a species of bird in the family Thraupidae

See also 

 Raimondo
 Raimondo (surname)